FC FCSB Youth is the team which usually represents Romanian club FCSB in the UEFA Youth League. Created in 2013 for the 2013–14 UEFA Youth League edition, it consists of mainly players under-19 from the youth sector.

Players

Current squad

Out on loan

References

FC Steaua București
2013 establishments in Romania
UEFA Youth League teams